Osipovo may refer to several rural localities in Russia:

Osipovo, Vladimir Oblast, selo in Klyazminskoye Rural Settlement, Kovrovsky District, Vladimir Oblast
Osipovo, Chagodoshchensky District, Vologda Oblast, village in Megrinskoye Rural Settlement, Chagodoshchensky District, Vologda Oblast
Osipovo, Sokolsky District, Vologda Oblast, village in Dvinitskoye Rural Settlement, Sokolsky District, Vologda Oblast
Osipovo, Vologodsky District, Vologda Oblast, village in Spasskoye Rural Settlement, Vologodsky District, Vologda Oblast